Melville George Arthur Pearce (9 January 1928 – 27 April 2011) was an Indian-born Australian field hockey player. He competed in the men's tournament at the 1956 Summer Olympics.

References

External links
 

1928 births
2011 deaths
People from Jabalpur
Field hockey players from Madhya Pradesh
Field hockey players from Perth, Western Australia
Australian male field hockey players
Olympic field hockey players of Australia
Field hockey players at the 1956 Summer Olympics
Anglo-Indian people
Indian emigrants to Australia
Australian people of Anglo-Indian descent
Australian sportspeople of Indian descent